Chukovezer is a village in Dragoman Municipality, Sofia Province, it is located in western Bulgaria.

References

Villages in Sofia Province